The International Union, United Automobile, Aerospace, and Agricultural Implement Workers of America, better known as the United Auto Workers (UAW), is an American labor union that represents workers in the United States (including Puerto Rico) and Canada. It was founded as part of the Congress of Industrial Organizations (CIO) in the 1930s and grew rapidly from 1936 to the 1950s. The union played a major role in the liberal wing of the Democratic Party under the leadership of Walter Reuther (president 1946–1970). It was known for gaining high wages and pensions for auto workers, but it was unable to unionize auto plants built by foreign-based car makers in the South after the 1970s, and it went into a steady decline in membership; reasons for this included increased automation, decreased use of labor, movements of manufacturing (including reaction to NAFTA), and increased globalization.

UAW members in the 21st century work in industries including autos and auto parts, health care, casino gambling, and higher education. The union is headquartered in Detroit, Michigan. As of February 24, 2022, the UAW has more than 391,000 active members and more than 580,000 retired members in over 600 local unions, and holds 1,150 contracts with some 1,600 employers. It holds assets amounting to  $1,026,568,450.

History

1930s
The UAW was founded in May 1935 in Detroit, Michigan under the auspices of the American Federation of Labor (AFL). The AFL had focused on organizing craft unions and avoiding large factories. But a caucus of industrial unions led by John L. Lewis formed the Committee for Industrial Organization within the AFL at its 1935 convention, creating the original CIO. Within one year, the AFL suspended the unions in the CIO, and these formed the rival Congress of Industrial Organizations (CIO), including the UAW.

The UAW rapidly found success in organizing with the sit-down strike, first in a General Motors Corporation plant in Atlanta, Georgia in 1936, and more famously in the Flint sit-down strike that began on December 29, 1936. That strike ended in February 1937 after Michigan's governor Frank Murphy played the role of mediator, negotiating recognition of the UAW by General Motors. The next month, auto workers at Chrysler won recognition of the UAW as their representative in a sit-down strike. By mid-1937 the new union claimed 150,000 members and was spreading through the auto and parts manufacturing towns of Michigan, Ohio, Indiana, and Illinois.

The UAW's next target was the Ford Motor Company, which had long resisted unionization. Ford manager Harry Bennett used brute force to keep the union out of Ford, and his Ford Service Department was set up as an internal security, intimidation, and espionage unit within the company. It was not reluctant to use violence against union organizers and sympathizers (see The Battle of the Overpass). It took until 1941 for Ford to agree to a collective bargaining agreement with the UAW.

Communists provided many of the organizers and took control of key union locals, especially Local 600 which represented the largest Ford plants. The Communist faction controlled some of the key positions in the union, including the directorship of the Washington office, the research department, and the legal office. Walter Reuther at times cooperated closely with the Communists, but he and his allies formed strategically an anticommunist current within the UAW.

The UAW discovered that it had to be able to uphold its side of a bargain if it was to be a successful bargaining agency with a corporation, which meant that wildcat strikes and disruptive behavior by union members had to be stopped by the union itself. According to one writer, many UAW members were extreme individualists who did not like being bossed around by company foremen or by union agents. Leaders of the UAW realized that they had to control the shop floor, as Reuther explained in 1939: "We must demonstrate that we are a disciplined, responsible organization; we not only have power, but that we have power under control.".

World War II
The war dramatically changed the nature of the UAW's organizing. The UAW's Executive Board voted to make a "no strike" pledge to ensure that the war effort would not be hindered by strikes. A vehement minority opposed the decision. but the pledge was later reaffirmed by the membership. As war production ramped up and auto factories converted to tank building, the UAW organized new locals in these factories and airplane manufacturers across the country and hit a peak membership of over a million members in 1944. That same year, Lillian Hatcher was appointed the first Black female international representative of the UAW.

Postwar
The UAW struck GM for 113 days, beginning in November 1945, demanding a greater voice in management. GM would pay higher wages but refused to consider power sharing; the union finally settled with an eighteen-and-a-half-cent wage increase but little more. The UAW went along with GM in return for an ever-increasing packages of wage and benefit hikes through collective bargaining, with no help from the government.

New leadership
Walter Reuther won the election for president at the UAW's constitutional convention in 1946 and served until his death in an airplane accident in May 1970. Reuther led the union during one of the most prosperous periods for workers in U.S. history. Immediately after the war left-wing elements demanded "30–40": that is, a 30-hour week for 40 hours pay. Reuther rejected 30–40 and decided to concentrate on total annual wages, displaying a new corporatist mentality that accepted management's argument that shorter hours conflicted with wage increases and other job benefits and abandoning the old confrontational syndicalist position that shorter hours drove up wages and protected against unemployment. The UAW delivered contracts for his membership through negotiation. Reuther would pick one of the "Big three" automakers, and if it did not offer concessions, he would strike it and let the other two absorb its sales. Besides high hourly wage rates and paid vacations, in 1950 Reuther negotiated an industry first contract with General Motors known as the "Treaty of Detroit" (Fortune magazine) becoming known as Reuther's Treaty of Detroit. The UAW negotiated employer-funded pensions at Chrysler, medical insurance at GM, and in 1955 supplementary unemployment benefits at Ford. Many smaller suppliers followed suit with benefits.

Reuther tried to negotiate lower automobile prices for the consumer with each contract, with limited success. An agreement on profit sharing with American Motors led nowhere, because profits were small at this minor player. The UAW expanded its scope to include workers in other major industries such as the aerospace and agricultural-implement industries.

The UAW disaffiliated from the AFL–CIO on July 1, 1968, after Reuther and AFL–CIO President George Meany could not come to agreement on a wide range of policy issues or reforms to AFL–CIO governance. On July 24, 1968, just days after the UAW disaffiliation, Teamsters General President Frank Fitzsimmons and Reuther formed the Alliance for Labor Action as a new national trade union center to organize unorganized workers and pursue leftist political and social projects. Meany denounced the ALA as a dual union, although Reuther argued it was not. The Alliance's initial program was ambitious. Reuther's death in a plane crash on May 9, 1970, near Black Lake, Michigan, dealt a serious blow to the Alliance, and the group halted operations in July 1971 after the Auto Workers (almost bankrupt from a lengthy strike at General Motors) was unable to continue to fund its operations.

In 1948, the UAW founded the radio station WDET 101.9 FM in Detroit. It was sold to Wayne State University for $1 in 1952.

Politics and Dissent
The UAW leadership supported the programs of the New Deal Coalition, strongly supported civil rights, and strongly supported Lyndon Johnson's Great Society. The UAW became strongly anti-communist after it expelled its Communist leaders in the late 1940s following the Taft–Hartley Act, and supported the Vietnam war and opposed the antiwar Democratic candidates.

According to Williams (2005) the UAW used the rhetoric of civic or liberal nationalism to fight for the rights of Black workers and other workers of color between the 1930s and 1970s. At the same time, it used this rhetoric to simultaneously rebuff the demands and limit the organizing efforts of Black workers seeking to overcome institutional racial hierarchies in the workplace, housing, and the UAW. The UAW leadership denounced these demands and efforts as antidemocratic and anti-American. Three examples, William argues, show how the UAW's use of working class nationalism functioned as a counter subversive tradition within American liberalism: the UAW campaign at the Ford plant in Dearborn, Michigan, in the late 1930s, the 1942 conflict in Detroit over the black occupancy of the Sojourner Truth housing project, and the responses of the UAW under the conservative leadership of Reuther to the demands of Black workers for representation in UAW leadership between the mid-1940s and the 1960s. See also League of Revolutionary Black Workers and Dodge Revolutionary Union Movement for the history of Black workers who questioned the corrupt leadership of the UAW in the 1960s and the 1970s.

1970s
The UAW was the most instrumental outside financial and operational supporter of the first Earth Day in 1970. According to Denis Hayes, Earth Day’s first national coordinator, "Without the UAW, the first Earth Day would have likely flopped!"

With the 1973 oil embargo, rising fuel prices caused the U.S. auto makers to lose market share to foreign manufacturers who placed more emphasis on fuel efficiency. This started years of layoffs and wage reductions, and the UAW found itself in the position of giving up many of the benefits it had won for workers over the decades. By the early 1980s, auto producing states, especially in the Midwestern United States and Canada, had been impacted economically from losses in jobs and income. This peaked with the near-bankruptcy of Chrysler in 1979. In 1985 the union's Canadian division disaffiliated from the UAW over a dispute regarding negotiation tactics and formed the Canadian Auto Workers as an independent union. Specifically the Canadian division claimed they were being used to pressure the companies for extra benefits, which went mostly to the American members.

The UAW saw a loss of membership after the 1970s. Membership topped 1.5 million in 1979, falling to 540,000 in 2006. With the late-2000s recession and automotive industry crisis of 2008–10, GM and Chrysler filed for Chapter 11 reorganization. Membership fell to 390,000 active members in 2010, with more than 600,000 retired members covered by pension and medical care plans.

21st century

UAW has been credited for aiding in the auto industry rebound in the 21st century and blamed for seeking generous benefit packages in the past which in part led to the automotive industry crisis of 2008–10. UAW workers receiving generous benefit packages when compared with those working at non-union Japanese auto assembly plants in the U.S., had been cited as a primary reason for the cost differential before the 2009 restructuring. In a November 2008, New York Times editoria, Andrew Ross Sorkin claimed that the average UAW worker was paid $70 per hour, including health and pension costs, while Toyota workers in the US receive $10 to $20 less. The UAW asserts that most of this labor cost disparity comes from legacy pension and healthcare benefits to retired members, of which the Japanese automakers have none.
The Big Three already sold their cars for about $2,500 less than equivalent cars from Japanese companies, analysts at the International Motor Vehicle Program said.  According to the 2007 GM Annual Report, typical autoworkers earned a base wage of approximately $28 per hour. Following the 2007 National Agreement, the base starting wage was lowered to about $15 per hour. A second-tier wage of $14.50 an hour, which applies only to newly hired workers, is lower than the average wage in non-union auto companies in the Deep South.

One of the benefits negotiated by the United Auto Workers was the former jobs bank program, under which laid-off members once received 95 percent of their take-home pay and benefits.  More than 12,000 UAW members were paid this benefit in 2005. In December 2008, the UAW agreed to suspend the program as a concession to help U.S. automakers during the auto industry crisis.

UAW Leadership granted concessions to its unions in order to win labor peace, a benefit not calculated by the UAW's many critics. The UAW has claimed that the primary cause of the automotive sector's weakness was substantially more expensive fuel costs linked to the 2003-2008 oil crisis which caused customers to turn away from large sport utility vehicles (SUVs) and pickup trucks, the main market of the American "Big Three" (General Motors, Ford, and Chrysler). In 2008, the situation became critical because the global financial crisis and the related credit crunch significantly impaired the ability of consumers to purchase automobiles. The Big Three also based their respective market strategies on fuel-inefficient SUVs, and suffered from lower quality perception (vis-a-vis automobiles manufactured by Japanese or European car makers). Accordingly, the Big Three directed vehicle development focused on light trucks (which had better profit margins) in order to offset the considerably higher labor costs, falling considerably behind in the sedan market segments to Japanese and European automakers.

The UAW has tried to expand membership by organizing the employees outside of the Big Three. In 2010, Bob King hired Richard Bensinger to organize Japanese, Korean, and German transplant factories in the United States.

In a representational election following a majority of the workers signing cards asking for UAW representation, in February, 2014 workers at Volkswagen's Chattanooga, Tennessee plant narrowly voted down the union 712 to 626. However, the UAW organized a minority union Local 42, which was voluntary and does not collect dues. After the close vote against the UAW, Volkswagen announced a new policy allowing groups representing at least 15% of the workforce to participate in meetings, with higher access tiers for groups representing 30% and 45% of employees. This prompted anti-UAW workers who opposed the first vote to form a rival union, the American Council of Employees. In December, 2014 the UAW was certified as representing more than 45% of employees.

The union continues to engage in Michigan state politics. President King was a vocal opponent of the right-to-work legislation that passed over the objection of organized labor in December 2012. The UAW also remains a major player in the state Democratic Party.

In March 2020, the Detroit United Auto Workers union announced that after discussion with the leaders of General Motors, Ford, and Fiat Chrysler Automobiles, the carmakers would partially shut down factories on a "rotating" basis to combat the COVID-19 pandemic.

Though primarily known for autoworkers, as of 2022, academic workers comprise a quarter of UAW membership. In 2022, the UAW affiliate at the University of California went on strike for higher pay, an event known as the 2022 University of California academic workers' strike.

Corruption and reform in the UAW 
A corruption probe by the Justice Department against UAW and 3 Fiat Chrysler executives was conducted during 2020 regarding several charges such as racketeering, embezzlement, and tax evasion. It resulted in convictions of 12 union officials and 3 Fiat Chrysler executives, including two former Union Presidents, UAW paying back over $15 million in improper chargebacks to worker training centers, payment of $1.5 million to the IRS to settle tax issues, commitment to independent oversight for six years, and a referendum that reformed the election mode for leadership. The "One Member One Vote" referendum vote in 2022 determined that UAW members could directly elect the members of the UAW International Executive Board (IEB), the highest ruling body of the UAW.

Technical, Office, and Professional (TOP) Workers
District 65, a former affiliate of the Retail, Wholesale and Department Store Union that included as a predecessor the United Office and Professional Workers of America, merged into the UAW in 1989.

In 2008, the 6,500 postdoctoral scholars (postdocs) at the ten campuses of the University of California, who, combined, account for 10% of the postdocs in the US, voted to affiliate with the UAW, creating the largest union for postdoctoral scholars in the country: UAW Local 5810.

The expansion of UAW to academic circles, postdoctoral researchers in particular, was significant in that the move helped secure advances in pay that made unionized academic researchers among the best compensated in the country in addition to gaining unprecedented rights and protections.

Leadership

Presidents
1935–1936: Francis J. Dillon
1936–1938: Homer Martin
1938–1946: R. J. Thomas
1946-1970: Walter Reuther
1970–1977: Leonard F. Woodcock
1977–1983: Douglas Fraser
1983–1995: Owen Bieber
1995–2002: Stephen Yokich
2002–2010: Ron Gettelfinger
2010–2014: Bob King
2014–June 2018: Dennis Williams
June 2018 – November 2, 2019: Gary Jones (Paid leave of absence starting November 2, 2019, resigned November 21, 2019)
November 3, 2019 – June 30, 2021: Rory Gamble
July 1, 2021 – present: Ray Curry

Secretary-Treasurers
1935: Ed Hall
1936: George Addes
1947: Emil Mazey
1980: Ray Majerus
1988: Bill Casstevens
1995: Roy Wyse
2002: Elizabeth Bunn
2010: Dennis Williams
2014: Gary Casteel
2018: Ray Curry
2021: Frank Stuglin

See also

 Finally Got the News, a documentary that reveals the activities of the League of Revolutionary Black Workers inside and outside the auto factories of Detroit.
 Final Offer – documentary showing the 1984 UAW/CAW contract negotiations
 Leon E. Bates
 List of United Auto Workers local unions
 2007 Freightliner wildcat strike
 2007 General Motors strike
 2019 General Motors strike
 Communists in the United States Labor Movement (1919–37)
 Communists in the United States Labor Movement (1937–1950)
 Women in labor unions

References

Further reading

 Andrew, William D. "Factionalism and anti‐communism: Ford local 600." Labor History 20.2 (1979): 227-255.

 Associated Press. "Drop in U.A.W. Rolls Reflects Automakers' Problems." Associated Press. March 28, 2008. online
 Babson, Steve. "Class, Craft, and Culture: Tool and Die Makers and the Organization of the UAW." Michigan Historical Review (1988): 33-55. online
 Babson, Steve. Building the union: skilled workers and Anglo-Gaelic immigrants in the rise of the UAW (Rutgers University Press, 1991) on the Irish tool and die makers who led the UAW at Ford plant

 Barnard, John. American Vanguard: The United Auto Workers During the Reuther Years, 1935–1970. Detroit: Wayne State University Press, 2004. .
 Barnard, John. Walter Reuther and the rise of the auto workers (1983) online
 Bernstein, Barton J. "Walter Reuther and the General Motors Strike of 1945-1946" Michigan History (1965) 49#3 pp 260-277.
 Borden, Timothy G. " 'Toledo is a good town for working people': Richard T. Gosser and the UAW's fight for pensions." Michigan Historical Review 26.1 (2000): 44-67.
 Boyle, Kevin. The UAW and the Heyday of American Liberalism, 1945–1968. Ithaca, N.Y.: Cornell University Press, 1995.  online

 Bromsen, Amy. "'They all sort of disappeared': The Early Cohort of UAW Women Leaders," Michigan Historical Review (2011) 37#1 pp 5–39.

 Buffa, Dudley W. Union power and American democracy: the UAW and the Democratic Party, 1972-83 (1984) online
 Cutler, Jonathan. "Labor's time: shorter hours, the UAW, and the struggle for American unionism." Class: The Anthology (2017): 125-139. online
 Fink, Gary M. ed. Labor unions (Greenwood, 1977) pp. 23–26.  online

 Friedlander, Peter. The Emergence of a UAW Local, 1936-1939 : A Study in Class and Culture (1976) online
 Gabin, Nancy. " 'They Have Placed a Penalty on Womanhood': The Protest Actions of Women Auto Workers in Detroit-Area UAW Locals, 1945-1947." Feminist Studies 8.2 (1982): 373-398. online
 Gindin, Sam. The Canadian auto workers: The birth and transformation of a union (James Lorimer & Company, 1995); a part of UAW until 1985

 Goode, Bill. Infighting in the UAW: The 1946 Election and the Ascendancy of Walter Reuther (Greenwood, 1994) online also see  online review; 
 Halpern, Martin. UAW Politics in the Cold War Era (SUNY Press, 1988) online
 Jackson, John H. Progress the U.A.W. and the Automobile: Industry the Past 70 Years (2003), for secondary schools.
 Katz, Harry C. "The US automobile collective bargaining system in transition." British journal of industrial relations 22.2 (1984): 205-217.
 Kornhauser, Arthur; Sheppard, Harold L.; and Mayer, Albert J. When Labor Votes: A Study of Auto Workers. (1956)
 Lewis-Colman, David M. Race against Liberalism: Black Workers and the UAW in Detroit (2008)  excerpt and text search
 Lichtenstein, Nelson. Walter Reuther: The Most Dangerous Man in Detroit Urbana, Ill.: University of Illinois Press, 1995.  scholarly biography; online
 Lichtenstein, Nelson. "Auto Worker Militancy and the Structure of Factory Life, 1937–1955," Journal of American History 67 (1980): 335–353, in JSTOR

 Lichtenstein, Nelson and Meyer, Stephen, eds. On the Line: Essays in the History of Auto Work. Urbana, Ill.: University of Illinois Press, 1988. , 
 
 Meier, August, and Elliott M. Rudwick. Black Detroit and the rise of the UAW (1979) online
 Mettler, Matthew M. "A Workers' Cold War in the Quad Cities: The Fate of Labor Militancy in the Farm Equipment Industry, 1949–1955." Annals of Iowa 68.4 (2009) online; UAW successfully raids an expelled Communist union.
 Morritt, Brett Theodore. "Systems of Male Privilege: The Industrial Relations Policies of the Ford Motor Company in the 1940s." Enterprise & Society (2021): 1-28. 

 Sherk, J. "UAW Workers Actually Cost the Big Three Automakers $70 an Hour." December 8, 2008. The Heritage Foundation. online
 Silvia, Stephen J. "The United Auto Workers’ Attempts to Unionize Volkswagen Chattanooga." ILR Review 71.3 (2018): 600-624.
 Smith, Mike. " 'Let's Make Detroit a Union Town': The History of Labor and the Working Class in the Motor City." Michigan Historical Review (2001): 157-173. online
 * Steigerwald, David. "Walter Reuther, the UAW, and the dilemmas of automation," Labor History (2010) 51#3 pp 429–453.
 Sugrue, Thomas J. "“Forget about Your Inalienable Right to Work”: Deindustrialization and Its Discontents at Ford, 1950–1953." International Labor and Working-Class History 48 (1995): 112-130.

 Tillman, Ray M. "Reform Movement in the Teamsters and United Auto Workers." In The Transformation of U.S. Unions: Voices, Visions, and Strategies from the Grassroots. ed by Michael S. Cummings and Ray Tillman. (1999) .
 Weekley, Thomas L. United we stand : the unprecedented story of the GM-UAW quality partnership (1996) online
 Wells, Donald M. "Origins of Canada's Wagner Model of Industrial Relations: The United Auto Workers in Canada and the Suppression of 'Rank and File' Unionism, 1936-1953." Canadian Journal of Sociology/Cahiers canadiens de sociologie (1995): 193-225. online

 Williams, Charles. "Americanism and anti-communism: the UAW and repressive liberalism before the red scare," Labor History (2012) 53#4 pp 495–515
 Williams, Charles. "Reconsidering CIO Political Culture: Briggs Local 212 and the Sources of Militancy in the Early UAW," Labor: Studies in Working Class History of the Americas (2010) 7#4 pp 17–43; focus on Local 212 president Emil Mazey
 Zieger, Robert H. The CIO, 1935–1955.. Chapel Hill, N.C.: University of North Carolina Press, 1995.

Primary sources

 Christman, Henry M. ed. Walter P. Reuther: Selected Papers. (1961 ) Paperback ed. Kessinger Publishing Company, 2007.
 Plug, Warner W., and Leonard Woodcock. The UAW in pictures (1971)
Reuther, Victor. The Brothers Reuther and The Story of the UAW: A Memoir (1976)

External links
 
 "History of the Canadian Auto Workers." Canadian Auto Workers
 "The Great Flint Sitdown Strike." Walter Reuther Library, Wayne State University
 Newly Elected UAW President Bob King on Reversing the Erosion of Workers’ Rights - video report by Democracy Now! (2010)

AFL–CIO
International Metalworkers' Federation
History of labor relations in the United States
Trade unions established in 1935
Congress of Industrial Organizations
Vehicle industry trade unions
Automotive industry in the United States
Organizations based in Detroit
1935 establishments in the United States
Walter Reuther